Antonio di Filippo di Lorenzo Niccolini (Florence, 1701–1769) was an Italian abbot, jurist and scholar, who was considered one of the leading figures of eighteenth-century Tuscany.

He was born into a noble Florentine family, the youngest child of Filippo, third Marquess of Ponsacco and Camugliano, and was a relative of the Pope. He studied at the University of Pisa and became a member of several Tuscan academies and President of the Botanical Society of Florence.

He was a member of a commission to regulate the carrying of arms which brought him into conflict with the Inquisition who claimed they had the responsibility. After further conflict with representatives of Habsburg-Lorraine, he was exiled from Tuscany in 1748, after which he travelled extensively. 

In 1747, then in London, he was elected a Fellow of the Royal Society as "a person of great Merit, universal Learning, and particularly well versed in Philosophical knowledge".

Notes

References
  — Includes a portrait of Niccolini as a boy and cites:

External links
 Brief history of the Niccolini family

1701 births
1769 deaths
Italian abbots
18th-century Italian jurists
Italian scholars
Fellows of the Royal Society